"Paradise" is a song by English singer-songwriter Black, which was released in 1988 as the fifth and final single from his debut studio album Wonderful Life. The song was written by Black and Dave "Dix" Dickie, and produced by Dix. "Paradise" reached number 38 in the UK Singles Chart and remained in the top 100 for four weeks.

Critical reception
On its release, David Quantick of New Musical Express commented, "Vearncombe has the knack of getting up melancholy better than anyone apart from Peter Hook's bass guitar. Bertolt Brecht coined the term einverstaendis to convey the idea of a happy resignation, an ungrudging acceptance of things. With Black we have that best of things, einverstaendis you can dance to." Lawrence Donegan, as guest reviewer for Record Mirror, stated, "As with all of Black's slower songs, the percussion track immediately grabs your attention. As long as he steers clear of James Hamilton disco territory, he can't really fail." Paul Massey of the Evening Express described the song as "mellow, but not a big hit".

Formats

Personnel
Credits are adapted from the UK CD single liner notes and the Wonderful Life CD booklet.

Paradise
 Black – vocals
 Dave Dix – keyboards, programming
 Tina Labrinski, Sara Lamarra, Doreen Edwards – backing vocals

Production
 Dave Dix – producer, mixer
 Bill Price – mixing on "Paradise"
 Dave Anderson – engineer on "Paradise" and "Sometimes for the Asking"
 Andy McPherson – engineer on "Dagger Reel"

Other
 Perry Ogden – photography
 John Warwicker – art direction, design
 Jeremy Pearce – design

Charts

References

1987 songs
1988 singles
A&M Records singles
Black (singer) songs